The 2011 Cleveland Browns season was the team's 63rd season as a professional sports franchise and its 59th season as a member of the National Football League (NFL).  The team had hoped to improve on its 2010 season, where it finished with a record of 5–11 and placed third in the AFC North, however, the team was eliminated from playoff contention in Week 14. This season marked the second season under the leadership of team president Mike Holmgren and general manager Tom Heckert, as well as the first season under head coach Pat Shurmur.  The Browns played all of their home games at Cleveland Browns Stadium in Cleveland, Ohio.

Off-season

Personnel changes 
On January 3, 2011, one day after the 2010 season, the Browns fired head coach Eric Mangini.  In two seasons with the Browns, Mangini had a record of 10–22 and a disappointing 2–10 record against division opponents.

On January 13, the team hired former St. Louis Rams' offensive coordinator Pat Shurmur to replace Mangini as head coach.  Shurmur served as the Rams' offensive coordinator from 2009–2010, and was an offensive assistant with the Philadelphia Eagles from 1999–2008.  This is his first opportunity as an NFL head coach.

On January 21, Shurmur made his first addition to the coaching staff, by hiring Dick Jauron as defensive coordinator.  Jauron, who most recently served as the Philadelphia Eagles' secondary coach, has served as defensive coordinator for the Jacksonville Jaguars from 1995–98, head coach of the Chicago Bears from 1999–2003, and head coach of the Buffalo Bills from 2006–09.  Jauron replaces Rob Ryan, who became the defensive coordinator of the Dallas Cowboys.

On January 25, the Browns hired Chris Tabor as special teams coordinator.  Tabor most recently served as the Chicago Bears' assistant special teams coach from 2008–2010.  Tabor replaces Brad Seely, who became the special teams coordinator of the San Francisco 49ers.

On January 31, the Browns added four new coaches to their staff.  The Browns hired former Oakland Raiders defensive line coach Dwaine Board as defensive line coach, former Arizona Cardinals defensive coordinator Billy Davis as linebackers coach, former University of Miami offensive coordinator Mark Whipple as quarterbacks coach, and former NFL wide receiver Mike Wilson as wide receivers coach.

The rest of the Browns' position coaches were retained from Mangini's staff.  The Browns have not hired an offensive coordinator, as Shurmur intends to call the offensive plays for the team.

Scheme Changes
This season marks the Browns' transition into the West Coast Offense of Coach Pat Shurmur and the 4–3 defense of defensive coordinator Dick Jauron.

Roster Changes

Free Agency 

F The Browns placed the franchise tag on Dawson

Signings

Trades

2011 Draft class 

The Browns did not have a 3rd or 6th round selection.  The Browns traded their original 7th round selection but later received a new 7th round selection as a compensatory pick.

Undrafted free agents 

* Weatherhead also played for the Cleveland Gladiators of the Arena Football League.

Uniform changes 
On June 16, it was announced that the Browns would be wearing white jerseys for all home games.  The Browns had previously worn white at home during the 1950s–1980s and again in the early 2000s.
Because the home team for all Browns' away games chose to wear their colored jersey, the Browns wore the same uniform for all 16 games for the first time in franchise history (although the Browns wore their brown jerseys for three preseason games).

Staff

Roster

Preseason

Schedule 
The Browns' preseason schedule was announced on April 12, 2011.

Roster Moves 
After the third preseason game, all NFL teams had to reduce their rosters to 80 players.  On August 28, The Browns released eight players, the majority of them being undrafted free agents.

After the final preseason game, all teams had to reduce their rosters to 53 players.  The Browns released 25 players and placed two players – RB Brandon Jackson and G Eric Steinbach – on injured reserve.  Notable players released include QB Jarrett Brown and DB Coye Francies.

Regular season

Schedule 

Note: Intra-divisional opponents are in bold text.

Game summaries

Week 1: vs. Cincinnati Bengals

The Browns began the season with a division game against the Cincinnati Bengals. The Bengals struck first, with two Mike Nugent field goals and a Jermaine Gresham touchdown reception. Down 13–0, the Browns struck back, with Colt McCoy completing two touchdown passes to give Cleveland the lead at halftime. Phil Dawson gave the Browns an insurance field goal, but late in the fourth, Bengals backup QB Bruce Gradkowski caught the Browns defense slow out of the huddle and hit A. J. Green for a 41-yard touchdown that proved to be the game winner. With the 27–17 loss, the Browns started the season 0–1.

Week 2: at Indianapolis Colts

The Browns took on the Indianapolis Colts in Week 2, with both teams looking to rebound from losses. The Colts moved the ball well early, but had to settle for two Adam Vinatieri field goals to take a 6–0 lead. The Browns answered with an Evan Moore touchdown reception from Colt McCoy. The Colts briefly regained the lead on another Vinatieri field goal, but the Browns responded with a Peyton Hillis touchdown run to take a 14–9 lead into halftime. The Colts added another field goal in the third, but the Browns scored 13 unanswered points in the fourth to put the game away and defeat the Colts 27–19. With the win, the Browns improved to 1–1.

Week 3: vs. Miami Dolphins

The Browns faced the Miami Dolphins without their leading rusher Peyton Hillis in a Week 3 matchup. The Dolphins took an early lead, converting a Colt McCoy interception into a 7–0 lead on a touchdown pass from Chad Henne. The Browns tied the game on a touchdown pass from McCoy to Joshua Cribbs. The Dolphins took the lead again on a Dan Carpenter field goal, and took a 10–7 lead into halftime. The Browns again tied the game in the third with Phil Dawson's field goal. The Dolphins added two more field goals, and had the Browns down six points in the final minutes. McCoy led the Browns down the field, and hit Mohamed Massaquoi on a 14-yard touchdown pass to give the Browns a last-minute, 17–16 victory. With the win, the Browns improved to 2–1 and it also became the first season since 2007 to where the team was actually at least a game above .500.

Week 4: vs. Tennessee Titans

With the loss, the Browns dropped to 2–2, heading into their Week 5 bye.

Week 6: at Oakland Raiders

With the loss, the Browns fell to 2–3.

Week 7: vs. Seattle Seahawks

With the win, the Browns improved to 3–3.

Week 8: at San Francisco 49ers

With the loss, the Browns fell to 3–4.

Week 9: at Houston Texans

With the loss, the Browns fell to 3–5.

In reaction to this game, Cleveland comedian Mike Polk filmed a video at Cleveland Browns Stadium in which he berated the Browns and dubbed the stadium a "factory of sadness", a nickname that has caught on for both the stadium and the Browns themselves.

Week 10: vs. St. Louis Rams

With the loss, the Browns fell to 3–6.

Week 11: vs. Jacksonville Jaguars

With the win, the Browns improved to 4–6.

Week 12: at Cincinnati Bengals

After being swept by the Bengals for the first time since 2009, the Browns dropped to 4–7.

Week 13: vs. Baltimore Ravens

With their 7th straight loss to the Ravens, the Browns fell to 4–8.

Week 14: at Pittsburgh Steelers

With the loss, the Browns dropped to 4–9. And as a result they officially clinched 4th-place in the AFC North.

Week 15: at Arizona Cardinals

With the loss, the Browns fell to 4–10 and finished 1–3 against NFC Opponents.

Week 16: at Baltimore Ravens

With their 8th straight loss to the Ravens, the Browns fell to 4–11.

Week 17: vs. Pittsburgh Steelers

With the loss, the Browns finished the season 4–12 and last place in the AFC North.

Standings

References

External links 
 2011 Cleveland Browns at Pro Football Reference (Profootballreference.com)
 2011 Cleveland Browns Statistics at jt-sw.com
 2011 Cleveland Browns Schedule at jt-sw.com
 2011 Cleveland Browns at DatabaseFootball.com  

Cleveland
Cleveland Browns seasons
Cleveland